The 1963–64 St. John's Redmen basketball team represented St. John's University during the 1963–64 NCAA Division I college basketball season. The team was coached by Joe Lapchick in his nineteenth year at the school. St. John's was an independent and played their home games at Alumni Hall in Queens, NY and Madison Square Garden in Manhattan. They finished with a 14–11 and no postseason play.

The highlight of the season included an upset victory of defending national champions and nationally ranked #9 Loyola of Chicago.

Roster

Schedule and results

|-
!colspan=9 style="background:#FF0000; color:#FFFFFF;"| Regular Season

References

St. John's Red Storm men's basketball seasons
St. John's
1963 in sports in New York City
St John